Today is a lifestyle show featuring several topical segments including health, cooking, men's & women's fashion, makeovers, DIY and travel as well as dealing with popular issues of the day. It is presented by Dáithí Ó Sé alongside Sinead Kennedy (currently on maternity leave), Emer O'Neill (Monday-Tuesday) and Maura Derrane (Wednesday-Friday).

The series returned for its tenth season on 27 September 2021.

Format
Live cookery demonstrations from some of Ireland's top television chefs now forms a daily part of the show with other segments featuring less frequently. Regular experts in each subject appear to discuss the topic at hand. Airing on the RTÉ One television channel in Ireland, "Today" debuted in November 2012, and replaced previous RTÉ day-time lifestyle shows such as The Daily Show and Four Live.

Today was initially hosted each Monday, Tuesday, Wednesday, Thursday and Friday by RTÉ presenters Maura Derrane and Dáithí Ó Sé being broadcast from RTÉ Studios in Cork. After the end of the first season RTÉ announced that Bláthnaid Ní Chofaigh and Norah Casey's section of the show was being axed. "Today" returned for a second season in September 2013 & is now hosted solely by Maura Derrane and Dáithí Ó Sé from Monday – Friday from RTÉ Cork Studios. In September 2020, it was announced that Sinead Kennedy had joined the show to co-host with Daithi on Monday and Tuesdays in order for Maura to spend more time with her family

Reception
Bernice Harrison, reviewer in The Irish Times, wondered in advance if it "might be a livelier alternative" to the "afternoon schedules [that] are clogged with antiques and property programmes". The eighth season of the show was extended by two weeks due to a rise in viewers as a result of the  COVID-19 pandemic.

References

External links
 Today at RTÉ Television

2014 Irish television series debuts
RTÉ original programming